The 2006 Western Illinois Leathernecks football team represented Western Illinois University as a member of the Gateway Football Conference during the 2006 NCAA Division I FCS football season. They were led by eighth-year head coach Don Patterson and played their home games at Hanson Field in Macomb, Illinois. The Leathernecks finished the season with a 5–6 record overall and a 2–5 record in conference play, placing sixth in the Gateway.

Schedule

Roster

References

Western Illinois
Western Illinois Leathernecks football seasons
Western Illinois Leathernecks football